Nilothauma is a genus of European non-biting midges in the subfamily Chironominae of the bloodworm family Chironomidae.

Species
N. babiyi (Rempel, 1937)
N. bicorne (Townes, 1945)
N. mirabile (Townes, 1945) 
N. brayi (Goetghebuer, 1921)
N. hibaratertium Sasa, 1993

References

Chironomidae
Diptera of Europe